The Roman Catholic Archdiocese of Tabora is the Metropolitan See for the Ecclesiastical province of Tabora in Tanzania.

In the year 2004 it had 257.390 faithful among 1.426.998 people (18.0%), with 64 priests (43 diocesans and 21 religious) (1 per 4,021 Catholics, 32 brothers and 159 sisters in 22 parishes.
As per 2020 statistics, it had 	235,748 faithful among 2,362,660 people (10%), with 97 priests (59 diocesan and 38 religious) which is approx. 1 priest per 2,430 catholics. Also there was 54 male religious and 229 female religious.

History
 January 11, 1887: Established as Apostolic Vicariate of Unianyembé from the Apostolic Vicariate of Tanganyika 
 May 31, 1925: Promoted as Diocese of Tabora
 March 25, 1953: Promoted as Metropolitan Archdiocese of Tabora

Special churches
The seat of the archbishop is St. Theresa’s Metropolitan Cathedral in Tabora.

Bishops

Ordinaries
 Vicars Apostolic of Unianyembé (Roman rite) 
 Bishop François Gerboin, M. Afr. (1897.01.28 – 1912.06.27)
 Bishop Henri Léonard, M. Afr. (1912.06.27 – 1925.05.31 see below)
 Vicars Apostolic of Tabora (Roman rite) 
 Bishop Henri Léonard, M. Afr. (see above 1925.05.31 – 1928.07.23)
 Bishop Edouard Michaud, M. Afr. (1928.11.29 – 1932.03.24), appointed Coadjutor Vicar Apostolic of Uganda
 Bishop Joseph Trudel, M. Afr. (1933.04.25 – 1949.02.04)
 Bishop Cornelius Bronsveld, M. Afr. (1950.05.31 – 1953.03.25 see below)
 Metropolitan Archbishops of Tabora (Roman rite)
 Archbishop Cornelius Bronsveld, M. Afr. (see above 1953.03.25 – 1959.12.21)
 Archbishop Marko Mihayo (1960.06.21 – 1985.03.09)
 Archbishop Mario Epifanio Abdallah Mgulunde (1985.03.09 – 2006.03.14)
 Archbishop Paul R. Ruzoka (since 2006.11.25)

Coadjutor Vicar Apostolic
Henri Léonard, M. Afr. (1912)

Auxiliary Bishop
Bernard Mabula (1969-1972), appointed Bishop of Singida

Suffragan dioceses
 Kahama
 Kigoma
 Mpanda

See also
Roman Catholicism in Tanzania

Sources

 Tanzania Episcopal Conference  
 Bolla Quemadmodum ad Nos, AAS 45 (1953), p. 705

Tabora
 
 
Tabora